Nand Kumar Patel (8 November 1953 – 25 May 2013) was an Indian National Congress politician from the province of Chhattisgarh. He was elected to the Kharsia Assembly Constituency five times in a row (1990, 1993, 1998, 2003 and 2008).

He was a cabinet minister in the state governments of Madhya Pradesh and Chhattisgarh. He was kidnapped and killed by Naxalites during the 2013 Naxal attack in Darbha valley.

On 25 May 2013, news broke that several Congress leaders were killed in a Naxalite attack on a Congress convoy. At first, Naxalites claimed to have kidnapped Nand Kumar Patel and his son Dinesh keeping up the hopes of their coming back alive. However, their bullet-ridden bodies were found in the Jiram valley in the Bastar district the next day.

On 27 May, the Naxalites claimed responsibility for the attack by issuing a statement which called it a punishment for atrocities committed by the Salwa Judum, the counter-Naxalite paramilitary forces in the Bastar area, and claimed the attack was targeted at its leader, Mahendra Karma.

The newly elected Chhattisgarh government has set up an SIT under Vivekanand Sinha to probe into the incident on January 2, 2019.

See also
 Vidya Charan Shukla

References 

Indian National Congress politicians
1953 births
2013 deaths
People from Raigarh district
Madhya Pradesh MLAs 1990–1992
Madhya Pradesh MLAs 1993–1998
Madhya Pradesh MLAs 1998–2003
Chhattisgarh MLAs 2000–2003
Chhattisgarh MLAs 2003–2008
Chhattisgarh MLAs 2008–2013
Assassinated Indian politicians
People murdered in Chhattisgarh
Indian murder victims
Terrorism victims in India
Deaths by firearm in India
Indian National Congress politicians from Madhya Pradesh